Xītáng (西塘) may refer to the following locations in China:

 Xitang, Beihai, town in Yinhai District, Beihai, Guangxi
 Xitang, Yueyang, town in Yueyanglou District, Yueyang, Hunan
 Xitang, town in Jiashan County, Zhejiang